Pen y Dre High School is an 11-16 mixed-sex comprehensive school situated in the Gurnos district of Merthyr Tydfil, Wales.

External links
Old Merthyr Tydfil: Pen y Dre High School - Historical Photographs of Pen y Dre High School.

Secondary schools in Merthyr Tydfil County Borough